The 2013–14 CAA men's basketball season marked the 29th season of Colonial Athletic Association basketball, taking place between November 2013 and March 2014.  Practices commenced in October 2013, and the season ended with the 2014 Colonial Athletic Association men's basketball tournament.

Preseason

Coaching changes
 Joe Mihalich was hired after a year of turmoil on and off the court led to Head Coach Mo Cassara being relieved of duties on March 22, 2013.

Preseason poll

Preseason All-Conference Teams

Colonial Athletic Association Preseason Player of the Year: Jerrelle Benimon, Towson

Regular season

Head coaches
 Doug Wojcik, Charleston
 Monté Ross, Delaware
 Bruiser Flint, Drexel
 Joe Mihalich, Hofstra
 Matt Brady, James Madison
 Bill Coen, Northeastern
 Pat Skerry, Towson
 Buzz Peterson, UNC Wilmington
 Tony Shaver, William & Mary

Rankings

Postseason

Colonial Athletic Association tournament

  March 7–10, 2014: Colonial Athletic Association Men's Basketball Tournament, Baltimore Arena, Baltimore, Maryland

Delaware defeated William & Mary, 75–74, in the finals of the 2014 CAA men's basketball tournament to win the conference, and earn an automatic bid to the 2014 NCAA Men's Division I Basketball Tournament.

NCAA tournament

The CAA had one bid to the 2014 NCAA Men's Division I Basketball Tournament, that being the automatic bid of Delaware.

National Invitation tournament 

No teams from the CAA were invited to play in the 2014 National Invitation Tournament.

College Basketball Invitational 

No teams from the CAA were invited to play in the 2014 College Basketball Invitational.

CollegeInsider.com Postseason tournament 

Towson was invited to play in the 2014 CollegeInsider.com Postseason Tournament

Awards and honors

Regular season

CAA Player-of-the-Week

 Nov. 11 - Frantz Massenat, Drexel
 Nov. 18 – Jerrelle Benimon, Towson
 Nov. 25 – Scott Eatherton, Northeastern
 Dec. 2  – Chris Fouch, Drexel
 Dec. 9  – Kyle Anderson, Delaware
 Dec. 16 – Frantz Massenat, Drexel (2)
 Dec. 23 – Ron Curry, James Madison
 Dec. 30 – Willis Hall, Charleston
 Jan. 6  – Willis Hall, Charleston (2), and Marcus Thornton, William and Mary
 Jan. 13 – Devon Saddler, Delaware
 Jan. 20 – Jerrelle Benimon, Towson (2)
 Jan. 27 – Scott Eatherton, Northeastern (2), and Devon Saddler, Delaware (2)
 Feb. 3  – Frantz Massenat, Drexel (3), and Marcus Thornton, William and Mary (2)
 Feb. 10 – Davon Usher, Delaware
 Feb. 17 – Davon Usher, Delaware (2)
 Feb. 24 - Jerrelle Benimon, Towson (3), and Zeke Upshaw, Hofstra
 Mar. 3  – Jerrelle Benimon, Towson (4)

CAA Rookie-of-the-Week

 Nov. 11 - Jamall Robinson, Hofstra
 Nov. 18 – Canyon Barry, College of Charleston and Omar Prewitt, William and Mary
 Nov. 25 – Omar Prewitt, William and Mary (2)
 Dec. 2  – Omar Prewitt, William and Mary (3)
 Dec. 9  – Jackson Kent, James Madison
 Dec. 16 – Jamall Robinson, Hofstra (2)
 Dec. 23 – Omar Prewitt, William and Mary (4)
 Dec. 30 – Jamall Robinson, Hofstra (3)
 Jan. 6  – Omar Prewitt, William and Mary (5)
 Jan. 13 – Omar Prewitt, William and Mary (6)
 Jan. 20 – Rodney Williams, Drexel
 Jan. 27 – Jackson Kent, James Madison (2)
 Feb. 3  – Jamall Robinson, Hofstra (4)
 Feb. 10 – T. J. Williams, Northeastern
 Feb. 17 – Yohanny Dalembert, James Madison and Rodney Williams, Drexel (2)
 Feb. 24 - T. J. Williams, Northeastern (2)
 Mar. 3  – Omar Prewitt, William and Mary (7), and Jamall Robinson, Hofstra (5)

Postseason

CAA All-Conference Teams and Awards

References